Horatio Walpole, 1st Earl of Orford (12 June 1723 – 24 February 1809) was a British Whig politician.

Walpole was the eldest son and heir of Horatio Walpole, 1st Baron Walpole.

He was admitted to Lincoln's Inn in January 1736, and matriculated at Corpus Christi College, Cambridge in 1741.

In 1747, he was elected as Member of Parliament for King's Lynn and held the seat until 1757 when he inherited his father's barony of Walpole (of Wolterton). In 1797, he inherited the barony of Walpole (of Walpole) from his cousin, the 4th and last Earl of Orford and was himself created Earl of Orford in 1806.

Letters from St James's Palace from George III to Walpole, dated 30 March 1806, show that the King gave his approval to the creation of Walpole's new title. On the same date, the King gave his written approval to Charles Medows Pierrepont, 1st Earl Manvers – like Walpole, a parliamentarian – who had asked the King for his permission to be created Earl Manvers.

On 12 May 1748, Walpole married Lady Rachel Cavendish (1727 – 8 May 1805), the third daughter of the 3rd Duke of Devonshire, and on his death in 1809, his titles passed to their eldest son, Horatio. Lord Orford and his wife had at least two other children: Lady Mary Walpole (born c. 1757), who married Thomas Hussey, 19th Baron Galtrim, on 4 August 1777 and had issue; and The Hon. George Walpole (20 June 1758 – May 1835).

In 1758 he was the godfather of Admiral Horatio Nelson, who was named after him.

References

Orford, Horatio Walpole, 1st Earl of
Alumni of Corpus Christi College, Cambridge
Members of Lincoln's Inn
Members of the Parliament of Great Britain for English constituencies
Orford, Horatio Walpole, 1st Earl of
Orford, Horatio Walpole, 1st Earl of
British MPs 1747–1754
British MPs 1754–1761
Horatio
Earls of Orford
Whig (British political party) politicians